Arandai is a dialect cluster of Teluk Bintuni Regency in West Papua, Indonesia. In Teluk Bintuni Regency, it is spoken in Aranday, Kamundan, and Weriagar districts.

Names and varieties
The treatment at Ethnologue appears to be inconsistent. ISO codes are assigned to two languages, "Arandai" and "Kemberano", the latter of which is also called Arandai. They are said to have 85% lexical similarity, which would make them dialects of one language. However, the two dialects given for Arandai, also called Kemberano and Arandai ( Tomu and Dombano), are said to have only 71% lexical similarity, making them different languages. Dialects of Kemberano (Weriagar) are listed as Weriagar (Kemberano) and Barau. 

Additional alternative names of Arandai/Kemberano/Dombano–Tomu are given as Jaban (Yaban), Sebyar, Sumuri. 

An additional name of Kemberano/Arandai/Barau–Weriagar is given as Kalitami.

Linguasphere 2010 makes a more consistent distinction:

20-HD Tomu–Kemberano
20-HDA Tomu–Arandai; includes Yaban, Sebyar
20-HDA-a Tomu
20-HDA-b Arandai (Dombano)
20-HDB Kemberano–Barau
20-HDB-a Kemberano (Kalitami)
20-HDB-b Weriagar
20-HDB-c Barau

Usher (2020) lists Dombano and Kemberano as distinct languages, with Dombano spoken inter alia in Tomu village, and Kemberano spoken in Kalitami and Wariagar.

References

Nuclear South Bird's Head languages